Zedníček is a surname. Notable people with the surname include:

 Jiří Zedníček (born 1945), Czech basketball player
 Pavel Zedníček (born 1949), Czech actor

Czech-language surnames